Agalenatea is a genus of  orb-weaver spiders first described by Allan Frost Archer in 1951.  it contains only two species.  it contains only two species: A. redii with a palearctic distribution and A. liriope, found in Ethiopia and Yemen.

References

Araneidae
Araneomorphae genera
Palearctic spiders